Mohammad Parvez Hossain Emon (born 12 June 2002) is a Bangladeshi cricketer. He made his Twenty20 debut for Bangladesh Krira Shikkha Protishtan in the 2018–19 Dhaka Premier Division Twenty20 Cricket League on 25 February 2019. He made his List A debut for Bangladesh Krira Shikkha Protishtan in the 2018–19 Dhaka Premier Division Cricket League on 8 March 2019. In December 2019, he was named in Bangladesh's squad for the 2020 Under-19 Cricket World Cup.

On 8 December 2020, in the 2020–21 Bangabandhu T20 Cup, Parvez scored a century for Fortune Barishal, against Minister Group Rajshahi. His century came from 42 balls, the fastest by a Bangladeshi cricketer in a T20 cricket match. In January 2021, he was one of four uncapped players to be named in a preliminary squad for the One Day International (ODI) series against the West Indies. In February 2021, he was selected in the Bangladesh Emerging squad for their home series against the Ireland Wolves.

He made his first-class debut for Chittagong Division in the 2020–21 National Cricket League on 22 March 2021. In November 2021, he was named in Bangladesh's Twenty20 International (T20I) squad for their series against Pakistan In July 2022, he was again named in Bangladesh's T20I squad, this time for their tour of Zimbabwe. He made his T20I debut on 2 August 2022, for Bangladesh against Zimbabwe.

References

External links
 

2002 births
Living people
Bangladeshi cricketers
Bangladesh Twenty20 International cricketers
Bangladesh Krira Shikkha Protishtan cricketers
Chittagong Division cricketers
Place of birth missing (living people)